Master Maggie is a 2019 American short film directed by Matthew Bonifacio and starring Lorraine Bracco and Neil Jain.

Cast
Lorraine Bracco as Maggie
Neil Jain as Graham
Brian Dennehy
Kenan Thompson
Chris Henry Coffey

Release
The film premiered at the Tribeca Film Festival on April 29, 2019.

Reception
Alan Ng of Film Threat gave the film an 8 out of 10.

References

External links
 

2019 films
2019 short films
American short films
2010s English-language films